In computer science, the order-maintenance problem involves maintaining a totally ordered set supporting the following operations:

 insert(X, Y), which inserts X immediately after Y in the total order;
 order(X, Y), which determines if X precedes Y in the total order; and
 delete(X), which removes X from the set.

Paul Dietz first introduced a data structure to solve this problem in
1982. This data
amortized time and order(X, Y) in constant time but does
not support deletion. Athanasios Tsakalidis used BB[α] trees with the same performance bounds that supports
 amortized time with indirection. Dietz and Daniel Sleator published an improvement to worst-case constant time in 1987.<ref
name="DietzSleator">. Full version,
Tech. Rep. CMU-CS-88-113, Carnegie Mellon
University, 1988.</ref> Michael Bender, Richard Cole and Jack Zito published significantly simplified alternatives in 2004. Bender, Fineman, Gilbert, Kopelowitz and Montes also published a deamortized solution in 2017.

Efficient data structures for order-maintenance have applications in
many areas, including data structure persistence,<ref
name="Driscoll">.</ref> graph algorithms<ref
name="Eppstein">.</ref> and fault-tolerant data structures.<ref
name="Aumann">.</ref>

List labeling

A problem related to the order-maintenance problem is the
list-labeling problem in which instead of the order(X,
Y) operation the solution must maintain an assignment of labels
from a universe of integers  to the
elements of the set such that X precedes Y in the total order if and
only if X is assigned a lesser label than Y. It must also support an
operation label(X) returning the label of any node X.
Note that order(X, Y) can be implemented simply by
comparing label(X) and label(Y) so that any
solution to the list-labeling problem immediately gives one to the
order-maintenance problem. In fact, most solutions to the
order-maintenance problem are solutions to the list-labeling problem
augmented with a level of data structure indirection to improve
performance. We will see an example of this below.

O(1) amortized insertion via indirection

Indirection is a technique used in data structures in which a problem
is split into multiple levels of a data structure in order to improve
efficiency. Typically, a problem of size  is split into
 problems of size . For
example, this technique is used in y-fast tries. This
strategy also works to improve the insertion and deletion performance
of the data structure described above to constant amortized time. In
fact, this strategy works for any solution of the list-labeling
problem with  amortized insertion and deletion
time.

The new data structure is completely rebuilt whenever it grows too
large or too small. Let  be the number of elements of
the total order when it was last rebuilt. The data structure is
rebuilt whenever the invariant  is
violated by an insertion or deletion. Since rebuilding can be done in
linear time this does not affect the amortized performance of
insertions and deletions.

During the rebuilding operation, the  elements of the
total order are split into  contiguous
sublists, each of size . The list labeling problem is solved on the set 
set of nodes representing each of
the sublists in their original list order. The labels for this subproblem are taken to be polynomial --- say , so that they can be compared in constant time and updated in amortized  time.  

For each sublist a
doubly-linked list of its elements is built storing with each element a
pointer to its representative in the tree as well as a local integer
label. The local integer labels are also taken from a range , so that the can be compared in constant time, but because each local problem involves only  items, the labels range  is exponential in the number of items being labeled.  Thus, they can be updated in  amortized time.

See the list-labeling problem for details of both solutions.

Order

Given the sublist nodes X and Y, order(X, Y) can be
answered by first checking if the two nodes are in the same
sublist. If so, their order can be determined by comparing their local
labels. Otherwise the labels of their representatives in the first list-labeling problem are compared.  
These comparisons take constant time.

Insert

Given a new sublist node for X and a pointer to the sublist node Y,
insert(X, Y) inserts X immediately after Y in the sublist
of Y, if there is room for X in the list, that is if the length of the list is no greater than  after the insertion.  It's local label is given by the local list labeling algorithm for exponential labels.   This case takes  amortized time.

If the local list overflows, it is split evenly into two lists of size , and the items in each list are given new labels from their (independent) ranges.  This creates a new sublist, which is inserted into the list of sublists, and the new sublist node is given a label in the list of sublists by the list-labeling algorithm.  Finally X is inserted into the appropriate list. 

This sequence of operations take  time, but there have been  insertions since the list was created or last split.

Delete

Given a sublist node X to be deleted, delete(X) simply
removes X from its sublist in constant time. If this leaves the
sublist empty, then we need to remove the representative of the
list of sublists. Since at least 

References

External links
 Two simplified algorithms for maintaining order in a list. - This paper (Michael A. Bender, Richard Cole, Erik D. Demaine, Martin Farach-Colton, and Jack Zito, 2002) presents a list-labeling data structure with amortized performance that does not explicitly store a tree.  The analysis given is simpler than the one given by (Dietz and Sleator, 1987) for a similar data structure.

Amortized data structures